Nardostachys is a genus of flowering plants in the family Caprifoliaceae. It contains one species, Nardostachys jatamansi.

References

Valerianoideae
Caprifoliaceae genera
Monotypic asterid genera